In distributed programming, a portable object is an object which can be accessed through a normal method call while possibly residing in memory on another computer.  It is portable in the sense that it moves from machine to machine, irrespective of operating system or computer architecture.  This mobility is the end goal of many remote procedure call systems.

The advantage of portable objects is that they are easy to use and very expressive, allowing programmers to be completely unaware that objects reside in other locations.  Detractors cite this as a fault, as naïve programmers will not expect network-related errors or the unbounded nondeterminism associated with large networks.

See also

 CORBA Common Object Request Broker Architecture, cross-language cross-platform object model
 Portable Object Adapter part of the CORBA standard
 D-Bus current open cross-language cross-platform Freedesktop.org Object Model
 Bonobo deprecated GNOME cross-language Object Model
 DCOP deprecated KDE interprocess and software componentry communication system
 KParts KDE component framework
 XPCOM Mozilla applications cross-platform Component Object Model
 COM Microsoft Windows only cross-language Object Model
 DCOM Distributed COM, extension making COM able to work in networks
 Common Language Infrastructure current .NET cross-language cross-platform Object Model
 IBM System Object Model SOM, a component system from IBM used in OS/2
 Java Beans
 Java Remote Method Invocation (Java RMI)
 Internet Communications Engine
 Language binding
 Foreign function interface
 Calling convention
 Name mangling
 Application programming interface - API
 Application Binary Interface - ABI
 Comparison of application virtual machines
 SWIG open source automatic interfaces bindings generator from many languages to many languages

Distributed computing architecture
Object (computer science)